Terror & Magnificence is a 1997 classical album by John Harle, featuring Elvis Costello, Sarah Leonard, and Andy Sheppard.

Track listing
 "Illyria" (de Mistress Mine) (Instrumental) – 3:39
 "O Mistress Mine" (de Mistress Mine) – 4:03
 "Come Away, Death" (de Mistress Mine) – 4:28
 "When That I Was and a Little Tiny Boy" (de Mistress Mine) – 5:10
 "Terror and Magnificence" – 20:06
 "Since First I Saw Your Face" (de The Three Ravens) – 3:50
 "The Three Ravens" (de The Three Ravens) – 5:37
 "How Should I My True Love Know?" (de The Three Ravens) – 4:53
 "Hunting the Hare" – 7:28
 "Rosie-Blood (Sederunt)" – 13:32

Charts

References

Elvis Costello albums
1997 classical albums